"Fight for You" is a song by H.E.R. written for the 2021 film Judas and the Black Messiah. H.E.R. co-wrote it with Tiara Thomas and co-composed and co-produced it with D'Mile. RCA Records released it as a digital single on February 4, 2021. 

The song received multiple film award-related nominations, including the Golden Globe Award for Best Original Song and the Critics' Choice Movie Award for Best Song, and won the Academy Award for Best Original Song at the 93rd ceremony. It also received three nominations at the 64th Annual Grammy Awards, including Song of the Year, winning for Best Traditional R&B Performance. The song reached the number 43 on Flanders' Ultratip chart.

Composition

H.E.R. co-wrote "Fight for You" with Tiara Thomas, and co-composed and co-produced it with D'Mile. The song was written for the 2020 film Judas and the Black Messiah, a biographical film about how William O'Neal betrayed Fred Hampton, the chairman of the Illinois chapter of the Black Panther Party in the late 1960s. Film director Shaka King told H.E.R. he wanted to listen to "something contemporary with echoes of 1968". After he heard elements inspired by Curtis Mayfield, he approved the song. H.E.R. said that "[t]here's not much that separates that time and that story from what's going on right now with the Black Lives Matter movement in the Black community". The lyrics discuss racism, police brutality and equality.

Musically, music critics said "Fight for You" was influenced by funk-soul, 1960s rhythm and blues, and 1960s-and-1970s soul music. It has an uptempo sound and starts with "aggressive" drums.

Promotion
"Fight for You" was released as the lead single from Judas and the Black Messiah: The Inspired Album on February 4, 2021.  H.E.R. performed the song live at The Late Show With Stephen Colbert in February 2021 and a pre-recorded performance was broadcast at the 93rd Academy Awards pre-show, Oscars: Into the Spotlight.

Critical reception
Kyle Eustice said H.E.R. conveys singer Marvin Gaye on "Fight for You". Andy Kellman commented that the singer shadows "You're the Man" by Gaye.

Accolades
At the 93rd Academy Awards, "Fight for You" won the Best Original Song award, which was called a surprise as "Io sì (Seen)", "Husavik" and "Speak Now" were seen as the favorites.

Charts

References

2020 songs
2021 singles
American soul songs
Best Original Song Academy Award-winning songs
H.E.R. songs
Songs written by D'Mile
Songs written by H.E.R.
Songs written by Tiara Thomas
Songs written for films
Works about the Black Panther Party
RCA Records singles